Balaxanı or Balakhani is a settlement and municipality near Baku, Azerbaijan, on the Absheron Peninsula.  Taking advantage of the area's oil pools, a 35 m deep well was dug manually in 1593.  The Russians built the first oil-distilling factory here in 1837.  

As of 2015 its population was 11,615.

Places of interest

Notable natives 
    
 Sadig Rahimov, Chairman of the Council of Ministers of Azerbaijan SSR (1954–1958)
, oil magnate and philanthropist

See also
Petroleum industry in Azerbaijan
Ovdan (Balakhani)
Haji Shahla Mosque

References

External links

 
Populated places in Baku
Municipalities of Baku